Jesse Colquhoun (born 12 October 2001) is an Australian professional rugby league footballer who plays as a  or  for the Cronulla-Sutherland Sharks in the NRL.

Background
Colquhoun played his junior football for the Collegians Rugby League Football club in Wollongong.

Playing career

2022
In Round 18 of the 2022 NRL season, Colquhoun made his first grade debut for the Cronulla-Sutherland Sharks against the North Queensland Cowboys off the bench in a 26–12 victory.

Statistics

NRL
 Statistics are correct as of the end of the 2022 season

References

External links
Cronulla-Sutherland Sharks profile

2001 births
Living people
Australian rugby league players
Cronulla-Sutherland Sharks players
Rugby league players from Wollongong